Sábado Al Mediodía (Saturday at Noon), Hosted by Celines Toribio, Jimmy Nieves, Luis Velasco and later Birmania Rios. Sabado Al Mediodia, a variety and entertainment show that was the number-one-rated local Spanish TV program on Univision's New York affiliate, WXTV-41, from March 27, 1993 to June 30, 2001. Almost every major Latino celebrity and personality — Ricky Martin, Luis Miguel, Celia Cruz, Daddy Yankee, Shakira, Juanes — has been a regular television guest.

External links 
New York Metro
Radio Notas
El Diario NY

Variety television series